Robert Graham (31 July 1884 – 31 May 1916) was a Scottish professional footballer who played in the Scottish League for Falkirk and Cowdenbeath as an inside right.

Personal life 
Graham worked as an engineer at Sharp & Sons Engineers, Camelon. Prior to the First World War, he married the daughter of one of the directors of Leicester Fosse. During the First World War, Graham saw action on the Invincible at the battles of the Falkland Islands and Jutland. He was killed in action during the latter engagement, when the Invincible was destroyed by a magazine explosion. Graham is commemorated on the Portsmouth Naval Memorial.

Career statistics

Honours 
Falkirk

 East of Scotland League: 1904–05

References 

Scottish footballers
Cowdenbeath F.C. players
Scottish Football League players
1884 births
1916 deaths
Footballers from Falkirk
Association football inside forwards
Falkirk F.C. players
Royal Navy personnel of World War I
British military personnel killed in World War I
20th-century Scottish engineers
20th-century British engineers
Royal Navy sailors

East Stirlingshire F.C. players